is a Japanese manga series written and illustrated by Nozomi Mino. It was serialized in Shogakukan's Premium Cheese! from March 2018 to March 2019 and in Cheese! from April 2019 to June 2022. As of November 2022, the series' individual chapters have been collected into twelve volumes. A live-action television drama adaptation aired from October to December 2022.

Media

Manga
Written and illustrated by Nozomi Mino, the series began serialization in Shogakukan's Premium Cheese! magazine on March 5, 2018.  In April 2019, the series moved to the Cheese! magazine. The series completed its serialization on June 24, 2022. An epilogue chapter is set to be released in August 2022. As of November 2022, the series' individual chapters have been collected into twelve tankōbon volumes.

In October 2020, Viz Media announced that they licensed the series for English publication.

Volume list

Live-action
A live-action television drama adaptation was announced in June 2022. The series is set to be directed by Smith, Kenjiro Tsubakimoto, and Hiroto Totsuka, with Sorami Date writing the scripts and Yuta Furukawa and Fumika Baba performing the leads. It aired on MBS TV's  programming block from October 27, 2022, to December 23, 2022. Disney Platform Distribution licensed the drama for an international release.

Reception
Caitlin Moore from Anime News Network praised the sex scenes and their emphasis on consensuallity, while also criticizing the story and artwork. Sheena McNeil from Sequential Tart praised the main characters and their relationship, though she also felt the art gave too much focus to Yuri.

The series was nominated for the 65th Shogakukan Manga Award in the shōjo manga category in 2019. The third volume had an initial print run of 170,000 copies, being the eleventh largest print run of any Shogakukan title in 2019. The series has sold 4.5 million copies.

References

External links
  
 

Japanese romance television series
Japanese television dramas based on manga
Manga adapted into television series
Romance anime and manga
Shogakukan manga
Shōjo manga
Viz Media manga
Yakuza in anime and manga